Till The End Of The Moon is an upcoming Chinese television series starring Luo Yunxi and Bai Lu. The series is expected to air on Youku with 40 episodes.

Synopsis
In order to save the world from Demon God Tantai Jin (澹台烬), Li Susu (黎苏苏), daughter of Hengyang Sect's leader, travels back 500 years as Ye Xiwu (叶夕雾) to prevent the young Tantai Jin from becoming the Demon God in the first place. Unbeknownst to her, Ye Xiwu is married to Tantai Jin, then a hostage prince sent to the Kingdom of Jing (景国). The two develop romantic feelings for each other, and Li Susu sacrifices herself to change the fate of Tantai Jin and the world.

After losing Li Susu, a grief-stricken Tantai Jin searches for her soul for 500 years and was rescued by a cultivation sect. He then develops into a cultivator, becomes a force for good, and even meets the reborn Li Susu again. Just as the two rekindle their love, the revelation of Tantai Jin's demonic origins nonetheless brings about controversy and evil intentions, driving the three realms into danger again.  Facing a brutal fate, Tantai Jin sets in motion a plan, and despite numerous misunderstandings, the two work together to stop the end of the world.

Cast

Main

 Luo Yunxi as Tantai Jin (澹台烬) / Cang Jiumin (沧九旻) / Mingye (冥夜) 
 Tantai Jin (澹台烬):  The fated Demon God, he is destined to become the world's greatest nemesis. Born with an evil bone, he is unable to understand human emotions, and can only hide this characteristic by imitating the reactions of those around him. Starting out as a hostage prince, he later escapes back to his own kingdom and becomes the ruling emperor. 
 Cang Jiumin (沧九旻): Alias of Tantai Jin while he was a cultivation disciple at Xiaoyao Sect. While there, he learns the concepts of honesty, loyalty and friendship from his mentor and sect leader Zhaoyou.
 Mingye (冥夜): A dragon. He is the powerful God of War and leader of the Upper Immortal Realm, who sees it as his duty to protect the world.
 Bai Lu as Li Susu (黎苏苏) / Ye Xiwu (叶夕雾) / Sangjiu (桑酒)
 Li Susu (黎苏苏): Born an immortal, she is introduced as a disciple of Hengyang Sect. She is tasked with time travelling back 500 years to find Tantai Jin, the future Demon God, and kill him before he can wreak havoc on the cultivation world. 
Ye Xiwu (叶夕雾): The younger daughter of General Ye of the Kingdom of Sheng, married to Tantai Jin.
 Sangjiu (桑酒): A clam princess. After using her clan's crown jewel to save an injured Mingye, she becomes his consort.

Supporting

 Chen Duling as Ye Bingchang (叶冰裳) / Monü (妹女) / Tianhuan (天欢)
Ye Bingchang (叶冰裳): Ye Xiwu's older sister, married to Xiao Lin. She has two love threads, enabling her to fall in love and be loved by those around her.
Monü (妹女): Sister of Xinu who reconnects with Gongye Jiwu. Siying’s older sister 
Tianhuan (天欢): An immortal and daughter of Mingye's predecessor. She has an unrequited love for Mingye.
 Deng Wei as Xiao Lin (萧凛) / Gongzhi Wuji (公治无忌) / Sangyou (桑佑)
 Xiao Lin (萧凛): The sixth prince of the Kingdom of Sheng. An upright general and Ye Bingchang's husband.
Gongzhi Wuji (公治无忌): Li Susu's older disciple brother in the Hengyang Sect.
 Sangyou  (桑佑): A clam prince and Sangjiu's older brother.

The Kingdoms
 Geng Yeting as Ye Qingyu (叶清宇), one of Ye Xiwu's brothers
 Xiao Shunyao as Tantai Minglang (澹台明朗), Tantai Jin's older brother
 Li Peien as Pang Yizhi (庞宜之), an official and Xiao Lin's coconspirator 
 Li Jiahao as Gan Baiyu (甘白羽), Tan Taijin's loyal bodyguard
 He Zhonghua as the King of Sheng (盛王), father to Xiao Lin
 Liu Min as Jing Lanan (荆兰安), servant to Tantai Jin's mother and chief of the Moon Tribe 
 Chang Lufeng as Ye Xiao (叶啸), decorated general and Ye Xiwu's father
 Deng Jinghong as Ye Zeyu (叶泽宇), one of Ye Xiwu's brothers
 Huang Yunyun as Yue Yingxin (月莹心), Tantai Jin's maid
 Tian Jingfan as Chuntao (春桃), Ye Xiwu's maid

Demon Realm
 Sun Zhenni as Pianran (翩然), a nine-tailed fox demon
 Yu Bo as Dimian (谛冕), a demon who falls for Chufeng
 Wang Yifei as Siying (姒婴), a drought demon and loyal general to the Demon God, Monu’s sister 
 Wang Xichao as Jingmie (惊灭), loyal general to the Demon God

Cultivation Realm
 Huang Haibing as Zhaoyou (兆悠)
 Leader of the Xiaoyou Sect who becomes Tantai Jin's mentor
 Zheng Guolin as Qu Xuanzi (衡玄子)
 Leader of the Hengyang Sect and Li Susu's father
 Huang Xinyao as Yue Fuya (月扶崖)
 Lin Shengyi as Zanghai (藏海) - Eldest disciple of Xiaoyou Sect
 Li Xinglin as Zanglin (藏林)- Second disciple of Xiaoyou Sect
 Wang Jiamin as Zangfeng (藏风)- Third disciple of Xiaoyou Sect

Ancient Gods
Zhang Zhixi as Chuhuang (初凰), a phoenix and ancient god who controls space. 
 Chen Bohao as Jize (稷泽), the ancient god who controls time. The only god remaining in the present timeline, he has guarded the deserted abyss for thousands of years.

Production
The series began filming on October 16, 2021 and finished on March 26, 2022. This series marks the second Otter Studios production with Luo Yunxi in the leading role. It also features Huang Wei as costume director, Zeng Minghui as styling director, Luan Hexin as art director, and commissioned Huatian Studio to do worldbuilding.

References

External website 
 Official Weibo

2020s Chinese television series
Television shows based on Chinese novels
Xianxia television series
Chinese web series
Upcoming television series
Youku original programming